The Studium Biblicum Version is the predominant Chinese language translation of the Bible used by Chinese Catholics. It is considered by many to be the Chinese Catholic Bible.

The Studium Biblicum Version was translated by the Studium Biblicum Franciscanum in Hong Kong (a bible society not affiliated with the United Bible Societies). Translation originally started in 1935 as a personal effort by a Franciscan Friar, the Blessed Gabriele Allegra, but translation work was halted due to World War II, and part of the finished translations were lost due to the war. The bible society was formed in 1945 when more translators joined the translation work, and the whole bible was completed in 1968. The translation was mostly based on the original Hebrew, Aramaic, and Greek manuscripts, but occasionally on an unidentified existing translation for “difficult passages”. Postulations by modern scholars were deliberately avoided, but the Greek manuscript edited by the Protestant scholars Aland, Black, Metzger, and Allen Wikgren was used as a reference as an ecumenical gesture.

The Studium Biblicum Version is considered by many, including some Protestants, to be very faithful to the original manuscripts.

Like many Catholic bibles, this translation includes numerous footnotes. The bible also includes several appendices.

The language of the Studium Biblicum Version is standard modern written Chinese, though some of the wordings may appear unnatural in Mandarin but still used in Cantonese (and might be considered unnatural by some precisely because some people do not expect such forms to be written). Standard transliterations are mostly used where they exist; in other cases, a transliteration based on Mandarin is used.

Typography of the Studium Biblicum Version
Text in the Studium Biblicum Version is typeset vertically from right to left. The typography is generally modern, with a small number of archaisms.

The Studium Biblicum Version uses standard Chinese punctuation, with the exception that the proper name mark and book title mark are both typeset on the right side instead of the currently-standard left. Among the old-style typography used are the use of sans serif type for emphasis (mostly chapter and section headings), and typesetting most punctuation marks as if they were ruby.

Verse numbers are typeset on the right-hand side of the first word of each verse as ruby.

Notes are typeset as footnotes; however, because it is typeset vertically, the footnotes appear on the far left side of the spread, instead of the bottom of the page.

Typesetting the proper name and book title marks on the right causes clashes with verse numbers and most punctuation marks. When clashes occur, the proper name or book title mark that causes the clash are omitted for the character with the clash; this typographic treatment causes parts of some proper names or book titles to be unmarked.

The characters used for Bible names, and consequently for many Bible books, differ from those in Protestant Chinese Bibles such as the standard Chinese Union Version. For example, "John" is 若望 (Ruò wàng) rather than the 约翰 （Yuēhàn） found in Protestant Bibles and secular sources.

Online versions
As the Studium Biblicum version is not in the public domain, permission to create online versions of this translation is granted on a case-by-case basis. Online versions include those hosted on the web sites of the Chinese Regional Bishop's Conference and the Wah Yan BibleNet.

See also
 The Blessed Gabriele Allegra
 Chinese Bible Translations
 Chinese Union Version
 Pastoral Bible
 Today's Chinese Version

External links
 《聖經：思高聖經學會譯釋》 (The Holy Bible: Translated and annotated by the Studium Biblicum O.F.M.), 1968. esp. p. III (Preface) and the copyright page. An online copy of the Studium Biblicum version is available at:
 Wah Yan BibleNet (with this preface)
Chinese Regional Bishop’s Conference
 Franciscans in Taiwan
 http://www.tianzhujiao.org/bible/
 Studium Biblicum Franciscanum Hong Kong 
 The Studium Biblicum OFM Collections 思高聖經學會藏書|Preservation for the Documentation of Chinese Christianity by Hong Kong Baptist University Library

1968 non-fiction books
Bible translations into Chinese
1968 in Christianity